Halls Corner is an unincorporated community in Kings County, California. Hall's Corner is the intersection of California State Route 41 and Grangeville Boulevard. David Hall built a store on the southeast corner.

References

Unincorporated communities in Kings County, California
Lemoore, California
Unincorporated communities in California